Hits 93 Volume 4 was the final compilation in a series of four albums collecting the biggest hits of 1993. It was released by Telstar Records and BMG, and it charted at #2 in December 1993.

The Hits 93 series are considered an extension of the original The Hits Album series which ran from 1984 to 1991, which BMG issued in association with CBS and WEA from 1986. The relaunched Hits brand differed from the original series because it was a single CD as opposed to the original double-album format which was popular in the 1980s.

Track listing 

 Take That featuring Lulu – "Relight My Fire"
 Cappella – "U Got 2 Let the Music"
 Frankie Goes to Hollywood – "Relax (MCMXCIII Remix)"
 M People – "Moving On Up (Master Edit)"
 The Shamen – "Comin' on Strong"
 2 Unlimited – "Maximum Overdrive"
 Culture Beat – "Mr. Vain"
 Haddaway – "Life"
 Urban Cookie Collective – "Feels Like Heaven"
 The Time Frequency – "Real Love"
 DJ Jazzy Jeff & The Fresh Prince – "Boom! Shake the Room"
 Lisa Stansfield – "So Natural" (Be Boy Mix)
 Chris Rea – "Julia"
 Björk featuring David Arnold – "Play Dead"
 Captain Hollywood Project – "More and More"
 The Grid – "Texas Cowboys"
 Lovestation – "Best of My Love"
 SWV – "Right Here" (Human Nature Mix)
 Oui 3 – "For What It's Worth"
 Right Said Fred – "Bumped"
 Bitty McLean – "Pass It On"

References 
 Collins Complete UK Hit Albums 1956–2005. Graham Betts. 2005. .

External links 
Hits 93 Volume 4 at Discogs

1993 compilation albums
Telstar Records compilation albums
Hits (compilation series) albums